Coenomyiodes edwardsi is a species of Fly in the family Xylomyidae, the "wood soldier flies".

Distribution
India & Nepal.

References

Xylomyidae
Diptera of Asia
Insects described in 1920
Taxa named by Enrico Adelelmo Brunetti